Finn Jensen can refer to:

 Finn Jensen (darts player) (1957/58–2007), Danish darts player
 Finn Jensen (speedway rider) (born 1957), Danish speedway rider
 Finn Jensen (swimmer) (1914–1987), Danish swimmer